"Vogue" is a song by industrial rock band KMFDM from their 1992 album Money. The song hit No. 19 on Billboard's Dance/Club Play Songs chart in May 1992. The tracks on the single are also included on the singles compilation album, Extra, Vol. 1.

Track listing
All songs written and composed by Sascha Konietzko unless otherwise noted.

1992 release

2008 7" reissue

Personnel
Dorona Alberti – vocals
En Esch – vocals (1, 3, 4)
Sascha Konietzko – vocals, bass, synths, programming
Günter Schulz – guitars

References

1992 singles
KMFDM songs
1992 songs
Songs written by Sascha Konietzko
Wax Trax! Records singles
Songs written by Günter Schulz
Songs written by En Esch